Darin Zanyar (born 2 June 1987), known simply as Darin, is a Swedish pop singer and songwriter born in Stockholm. He is one of Sweden's best-selling artists with seven number one albums.

Life and career

Early life 
Darin was born in Stockholm to Kurdish parents Shwan and Ashti, who are from Iraqi Kurdistan. He grew up in a musical family and began singing at an early age, citing Michael Jackson, Stevie Wonder and Whitney Houston as some of his biggest inspirations. He started writing and recording songs at the age of 14 after being discovered by a music producer in school after a performance.

2004–2005: Breakthrough in Idol, "The Anthem" and "Darin" 
Darin became nationally famous in 2004 when he participated in the first season of the Swedish Idol at the age of 16. He quickly became one of the favorite contestants in the show and was the only one to receive 78% of the public votes at the semi-final. He ended up as the runner-up and was signed by SonyBMG the day after the finale.
In February 2005 his debut album The Anthem was released. The album entering the Swedish Album Charts at number 1 and was certified gold by the IFPI. His first single "Money for Nothing" was written by Robyn and went straight to No. 1. In 2005 Darin was the most exposed person in the media in the country. They often wrote about his hysterical fans and referred to him as "The perfect popstar".

Later the same year Darin released his second, self-titled, album, Darin which also peaked at number one. It was his first to be released outside of Sweden, being released in Finland. Darin was certified platinum. Darin worked with record producer RedOne while creating the album, subsequently releasing the platinum selling "Step Up", which spent a total of 26 weeks on Sverigetopplistan and was also the first single to be released in Finland. Furthermore, the album included the singles "Who's That Girl" and "Want Ya!".

2006: Break the News 

In 2006, Darin won Song of the Year at the Swedish Grammis for "Money for Nothing". Later in 2006, he released his first DVD, Tour Videos Interview, which was mainly a concert DVD from a 2006 tour.

In November 2006, Darin released his third album studio album,Break the News, which debuted at number 1 on the Swedish Charts. The album included the singles "Perfect", "Everything But the Girl", "Desire" and "Insanity".

2007–2009: Europe and Flashback 

In 2007, Darin signed a contract with EMI Germany to release music in Germany, Austria and Switzerland and in August 2007, "Insanity" was released.

In 2008, Darin started to work on his fourth studio album, Flashback, together with RedOne. The album was released in December 2008 and charted at number 10 in Sweden, making it Darin's first album not to reach number one in the country. The album included the singles "Breathing Your Love", a duet with American singer Kat DeLuna, "Runaway" and "What If", a song which was released in collaboration with Friends, a Swedish anti-bullying charity.

In 2009, Darin performed the song Se på mej at Melodifestivalen 2009 as an interval act. In October 2009, Darin performed a cover of Coldplay's "Viva la Vida" on Idol. The song was released as a single, and reached the number one on the Swedish singles chart, making it more successful than Coldplay's original in Sweden.

2010: Melodifestivalen and Lovekiller 

In November 2009, it was announced that Darin would be participating in Melodifestivalen 2010, Darin entered with the mid-tempo ballad "You're Out of My Life", which was written by Tony Nilsson and Henrik Janson. Darin performed 7th in Heat 3 of the contest and progressed to the final ultimately placing 4th.

In June 2010, Darin began a 17 date Summer Tour in Sweden.

In August 2010, Darin would soon be released the single "Lovekiller". The album Lovekiller was released in August 2010 and included the singles Viva la Vida, You're Out of My Life, "Can't Stop Love", "Microphone" and "Lovekiller". The album was certified gold in the first week of its release and peaked at number one on the Swedish album chart.

2012: Så mycket bättre and Chart record 
In February 2012 Darin released the single "Nobody Knows", which was the first single from his (then) upcoming album Exit. In October 2012 Swedish television network TV4 aired the first episode of the third season of Så mycket bättre featuring Darin, a reality TV show in which each artist attempts to do their own version of another artists well-known songs, with each person getting an episode featuring a selection of their songs being performed by the other musicians. Darin performed six songs in the show: "Stockholm", "En Apa Som Liknar Dig", "I Can't Get You Off My Mind", "Astrologen", "Magdalena" and "Seven Days a Week". He broke the Swedish singles chart record and had 6 top 10 songs on iTunes at the same time.

On 21 November 2012 Sony Music Sweden released a collection of Darin's songs from his four albums released by Sony. Det bästa av.

2013: Exit 

In January 2013, Darin released his sixth studio album, Exit which went straight to number one on the Swedish album chart; becaming his fifth number one album. Darin had spent time in the US working with worldwide known producers and songwriters such as Jim Beanz, The Jackie Boyz, Victoria "Lady V" Horn to make the album. Exit.

In May 2013 a new single entitled "So Yours" was released in Europe due to a performance as the interval act during the second semi-final of the Eurovision Song Contest 2013 in Malmö.

In mid 2013, Darin travelled to the Philippines to film the documentary En resa för livet together with SOS Children's Villages and three other artists, Eagle-Eye Cherry, Sophie Zelmani and Uno Svenningsson to bring attention to the poverty in the country and also try to gain and collect as many sponsors as possible for the children in the children's villages. Darin and Eagle-Eye Cherry also wrote and sang the lead song "Dream Away" for the documentary that was aired on TV4. All the revenues went to SOS Children's Villages.

2014–2016: Fjärilar i Magen and Dex Music 

In 2014, Darin started writing new songs in Swedish for the first time. He got inspired by recording a tribute song to the late Ted Gärdestad in the Atlantis-studio in Stockholm, where ABBA also recorded most of their albums and he wanted to record the same way they did.

In March 2015 Darin released his first single "Ta mig tillbaka" from his (then) upcoming Swedish album Fjärilar i magen. It was the first time he recorded a song with only acoustic instruments, which gave the production a different sound to what he had before. The lyrics was an autobiographical story about his childhood and growing up in the 1990s. The single went 4× platinum and was the most streamed song in Swedish that year.

The album Fjärilar i magen was released in September 2015 by Darin's own record company Dex Music and became his sixth number one album in Sweden. In 2015, Darin was signed by Sony Music for all the Asian countries, including the Middle East for his previous English album Exit.

2017–2020: Tvillingen and new singles 
Darin continued to make music in Swedish and released his eighth studio album Tvillingen, on 24 November 2017. The album peaked at number one on the Swedish Chart. Singles "Tvillingen" and" "Ja må du leva" were both certified 2× platinum.

Darin has since then released a handful of singles: "Astronaut", "Identitetslös", "Hög", "Finns inga ord" and "En säng av rosor".

Darin has described his song "Identitetslös" as his most personal song yet and has mentioned that the song is about being lost and not knowing where you belong. He further stated that there had always been that "inner conflict" in him, referring to his history being an immigrant in Sweden.

2021–present: My Purple Clouds 
In May 2021, Darin released the single "Can't Stay Away", his first single in English, since 2013. He released the song "Holding Me More" in October 2021 and his first Christmas song "What's Christmas Anyway" in November 2021. In May 2022, he released the single "Superstar". An EP titled My Purple Clouds was released in December 2022.

Other collaborations 
As well as being a successful performer, Darin is also an established songwriter
 In 2007, Leona Lewis covered Darin's ballad "Homeless" for her debut album Spirit.
 In 2009, "Love Struck", a song co-written by Darin and David Jassy, became the first official single for the American boyband V Factory.
 In June 2010, Darin was asked by Swedish broadcaster SVT to record a specially written song "Can't Stop Love" for the Royal Wedding of Princess Victoria and Daniel Westling.
 In 2010, the song "Foolish" originally recorded for the album Lovekiller was recorded by Shayne Ward for his album Obsession.
 Darin wrote the Idol 2011 winner song All This Way for eventual winner Amanda Fondell.
 Darin wrote a song called "Turn It Up", originally on the track list for Lovekiller, but gave it to the British girl group, A Girl Called Alice.
 Darin co-wrote the song "Under The Radar" with Tony Nilsson and Teddy Sky. It was the first single for the artist Qpid.
 In October 2011, it was announced that Darin was involved in writing a new song for Swedish singer Eddie Razaz, titled "Let Me In".

Personal life 
In early August 2020, Darin came out as gay on Instagram.

Discography

Albums 
The Anthem (2005)
Darin (2005)
Break the News (2006)
Flashback (2008)
Lovekiller (2010)
Exit (2013)
Fjärilar i magen (2015)
Tvillingen (2017)

Awards 
Darin has received several awards throughout his career, including:
A Grammis in 2006, Rockbjörn (Rock bear award)
Nickelodeon Kids Choice Award
The Voice 06 Award in Sweden
NRJ Award for Best Nordic song in Finland
 Kurd of the Year award in 2005
Artist of the Year at the QX Gaygalan Awards in 2013
LGBTQ of the Year and Song of the Year for "En säng av rosor" at the QX Gaygalan Awards in 2021

References

External links 

Darin official website

1987 births
Living people
Singers from Stockholm
Swedish people of Kurdish descent
Swedish pop singers
Idol (Swedish TV series) participants
English-language singers from Sweden
Swedish-language singers
Swedish people of Iraqi descent
21st-century Swedish male singers
Gay singers
Swedish LGBT singers
Swedish gay musicians
20th-century Swedish LGBT people
21st-century Swedish LGBT people
Melodifestivalen contestants of 2010